The Franklin D. Murphy Sculpture Garden is one of the most comprehensive sculpture gardens in the United States. The garden is located on the campus of the University of California, Los Angeles and is run by the Hammer Museum.

The sculpture garden was founded in 1967. It spans more than five acres and currently has more than 70 international sculptures, by figural and abstract artists such as Jean Arp, Deborah Butterfield, Alexander Calder, Barbara Hepworth, Jacques Lipchitz, Henry Moore, Isamu Noguchi, Auguste Rodin, David Smith, Claire Falkenstein, Gaston Lachaise, Henri Matisse, Francisco Zúñiga, and others.

List of the sculptures

 Oliver Andrews, Architectural Sculpture, 1966
 Alexander Archipenko, Queen of Sheba, 1961
 Jean Arp, Fruit Hybrid dit la Pagode (Hybrid Fruit Called Pagoda), 1934
 Jean Arp, Ptolémée III (Ptolemy III), 1961
 Leonard Baskin, Prophet: Homage to Rico Lebrun, 1971
 Fletcher Benton, Dynamic Rhythms Orange (Phase III), 1976
 Emile-Antoine Bourdelle, Les Nobles Fardeaux (Noble Burdens), 1910
 Emile-Antoine Bourdelle, Tête de la France (Head of France), 1925
 Alberto Burri, Grande Cretto Nero (Large Black Cracks), 1976–77
 Deborah Butterfield, Pensive, c. 1997
 Alexander Calder, Button Flower, 1959
 Anthony Caro, Halfway, 1971
 Aldo Casanova, Artemis of Ephesus, 1964–66
 Lynn Chadwick, Encounter VIII, 1957
 Leo Cherne, Ralph J. Bunche, 1958
 Pietro Consagra, Colloquio Duro (Difficult Dialogue), 1959
 Sorel Etrog, War Remembrance, 1960–61 
 Sorel Etrog, Mother and Child, 1962–64
 Claire Falkenstein, Point as a Set No. 25, 1970
 Eric Gill, Mulier, c. 1912
 Robert Graham, Dance Columns I and II, 1978
 Dimitri Hadzi, Elmo III, 1960
 Dimitri Hadzi, Elmo V, 1959–61
 Barbara Hepworth, Oval Form (Trezion), 1961–63
 Barbara Hepworth, Elegy III (Hollow Form with Color), 1966
 Richard Hunt, Why?, 1974
 Gaston Lachaise, Standing Woman (Heroic Woman), 1932
 Henri Laurens, Automne (Autumn), 1948
 Jacques Lipchitz, Baigneuse (Bather), 1923–25
 Jacques Lipchitz, Le chant des voyelles (The Song of the Vowels), 1931–32
 Anna Mahler, Tower of Masks, 1961 
 Anna Mahler, Night, 1963
 Aristide Maillol, Tête héroïque (Heroic Head), 1923
 Aristide Maillol, Torso, c. 1938
 Gerhard Marcks, Maja, 1941
 Gerhard Marcks, Freya, 1950
 Henri Matisse, Bas Relief I-IV (The Back Series), 1909-1930
 Joan Miró, Mère Ubu, 1975
 Henry Moore, Two-Piece Reclining Figure, No.3, 1961 
 Robert Muller, Autel (Altar), 1962–64
 Reuben Nakian, La chambre a coucher de l'empereur (The Emperor's Bedchamber), 1954
 Isamu Noguchi, Garden Elements, 1962
 George Rickey, Two Lines Oblique Down (Variation III), 1970–74
 Giorgio Amelio Roccamonte, Abstraction, 1963
 Auguste Rodin, L'homme qui marchi (The Walking Man), 1878 and 1899-1900, enlarged 1905-07, currently under renovation. 
 Tony (Bernard) Rosenthal, Abstract Plaque, 1964
 Richard Serra, T.E.U.C.L.A., 2006
 David Smith, Cubi XX, 1964
 Francesco Somaini, Verticale-Assalonne (Vertical-Absalom), 1959
 Elden Tefft, Franklin D. Murphy, 1960
 George Tsutakawa, Obos 69, 1969
 William Tucker, Untitled, 1967
 William Turnbull, Column, 1970
 Vladas Vildžiūnas, The Bird Goddess, 1977
 Peter Voulkos, Soleares, c. 1959
 Peter Voulkos, Gallas Rock, 1960
 Jack Zajac, Ram Head with Broken Horn, VI, 1963
 Jack Zajac, Bound Goat, Wednesday, 1973
 William Zorach, Victory, 1950
 Francisco Zúñiga, Desnudo Reclinado (Reclining Nude), 1970
 Francisco Zúñiga, Madre con niño en la cadera (Mother with Child at Her Hip), 1979

References

External links

UCLA Hammer Museum  — Franklin D. Murphy Sculpture Garden
Public Art at the University of California, Los Angeles

University of California, Los Angeles buildings and structures
 
Art museums and galleries in Los Angeles
Outdoor sculptures in Greater Los Angeles
Sculpture gardens, trails and parks in California
Gardens in California
Open-air museums in California
University of California, Los Angeles
Art museums established in 1967
1967 establishments in California
Westwood, Los Angeles
Sculpture gardens, trails and parks in the United States